Torquato may refer to:

 Torquato Cardilli (born 1942), Italian Muslim ambassador
 Torquato Neto (1944–1972), Brazilian journalist and poet
 Torquato Taramelli (1845–1922), Italian geologist
 Torquato Tasso (1544–1595), Italian poet

Italian masculine given names